Kim Bo-yong (born 15 July 1997) is a South Korean footballer currently playing as a forward for Chiangmai in Thai League 2.

Career statistics

Club

References

External links 
 

1997 births
Living people
Soongsil University alumni
South Korean footballers
South Korean expatriate footballers
Association football forwards
K League 2 players
Kim Bo-yong
Uzbekistan Super League players
Hwaseong FC players
Jeonnam Dragons players
Kim Bo-yong
Expatriate footballers in Uzbekistan